Haroon Al Rashid is a Bangladesh Nationalist Party politician and the former Member of Parliament of Brahmanbaria-3.

Career
Rashid was elected to parliament from Brahmanbaria-3 as a Bangladesh Nationalist Party candidate in 1991, 1996, and 2001.

References

Bangladesh Nationalist Party politicians
Living people
5th Jatiya Sangsad members
6th Jatiya Sangsad members
7th Jatiya Sangsad members
8th Jatiya Sangsad members
Year of birth missing (living people)